Orville Taylor (born 11 May 1970) is a retired male sprinter from Jamaica. He claimed a silver medal at the 1995 Pan American Games in Mar del Plata, Argentina in the men's 4x400 metres relay, alongside Dennis Blake, Roxbert Martin, and Michael McDonald. Taylor set his personal best in the men's 200 metres (20.67) on 2002-05-25 in San Angelo, Texas.

References

45.54A 
 Orville Taylor JAM 11May1970 5 
 Ciudad de México 9Jun1996 
 
 400

1970 births
Living people
Jamaican male sprinters
Athletes (track and field) at the 1994 Commonwealth Games
Athletes (track and field) at the 1995 Pan American Games
Commonwealth Games medallists in athletics
Pan American Games silver medalists for Jamaica
Commonwealth Games silver medallists for Jamaica
Pan American Games medalists in athletics (track and field)
Medalists at the 1995 Pan American Games
Medallists at the 1994 Commonwealth Games